Madame Sand is a 1917 play written by Philip Moeller, who subtitled it "a biographical comedy". It consists of three acts, with a medium-sized cast and moderate pacing. Most of the play's characters are historical, figures from the Romantic literary and musical world of the 1830s. Each act has only one scene and one setting. The subject is an episodic treatment of three love affairs conducted by George Sand, with Alfred de Musset, Pietro Pagello, and Frédéric Chopin. 

The play was long on witty conversations and irony. Intended as mild satire, some critics labelled it as burlesque, while others pointed out the limited appeal of Romantic era writers for modern audiences. "Who reads George Sand anymore?" one critic quoted. Moeller used the characters' own writings as source material, though he wasn't above lifting a phrase from elsewhere and ascribing it to one of his figures. Very much a star vehicle, the play's appeal in actual performance relies on the popularity of the sole lead: in the original US production this was Mrs. Fiske, while in the UK revival it was Mrs. Patrick Campbell.

Characters
Supporting and featured characters are listed in order of appearance within their scope.

Lead 
George Sand.

Supporting 
Mme. de Musset — Alfred and Paul's mother.  
Paul de Musset — Alfred's older brother.  
Buloz — Editor of the Revue des deux Mondes.
Heinrich Heine.
Alfred de Musset.  
Dr. Pietro Pagello — Mme. Sand's Italian physician.
Lucrezia Violente — Pagello's aptly-surnamed mistress.
Franz Liszt.
Frédéric Chopin.

Featured 
Rosalie — Maid at Mme. Sand's Paris home. 
Casimir Dudevant — Mme. Sand's estranged husband.
Mlle. de Fleury — One of three demoiselles at Baron Rothchild's reception for Chopin.
Mlle. Rolande — Oldest of the three demoiselles, who misrecognizes all the celebrities.
Mlle. de Latour — Youngest of the three demoiselles, who keeps a diary.
Lackey — Repeatedly opens the door at the Baron de Rothschild's residence.

Walk-on 
 Guests at the reception of Baron de Rothschild for Chopin.

Synopsis
The complete text of the play, as published in the first edition of 1917, is available on Wikimedia Commons. The summary below is highly condensed for quick reference.

Original production

Background
Philip Moeller had written several one-act historical satires for the Washington Square Players during 1915-1916. A theatrical manager asked for a scenario for a full-length commercial work of the same type, but ended up not using it. Moeller then showed the scenario to Arthur Hopkins, who commissioned him to write the play. From his initial reading of the scenario, Hopkins considered it a vehicle for Mrs. Fiske. He sent the completed play to Harrison Fiske, asking him to have his wife read it. Mrs. Fiske liked the play and convinced George C. Tyler to produce it for Klaw and Erlanger, to whom she was then under contract.    

Rollo Peters, then working with the Washington Square Players, was hired to design the sets. Hopkins signed José Ruben in June 1917 for the production to be mounted that fall.

Tryouts and revisions
The first performance of Madame Sand was a benefit for Mercy Hospital in Baltimore. It was held at the Academy of Music on October 29, 1917. Separate reviews in The Baltimore Sun and its evening edition agreed that the production was not a play but an episodic satire. Both reviewers praised Mrs. Fiske's interpretation of George Sand, but mentioned her nervousness and difficulty in making herself understood in the large theatre. 

After three days of performances, the production went north to New York, playing one night stands in Poughkeepsie and Ithaca, then a full week at the Star Theater in Buffalo before heading to Broadway. One Buffalo reviewer summed up the local experience: "The comedy is of the intellectual sort and plenty of it last night went right over the footlights and didn't find a resting place in the audience". One change from the Baltimore tryout was the addition of a credited role to program guides for "Lackey", who silently opens doors in the third act. Neither edition of the published play has this role in the Character list.

Cast

Premiere
Madame Sand premiered at Broadway's Criterion Theatre on November 19, 1917.

Reception
The reviewer for The New York Times admired the cleverness of the dialogue, but felt that the production amounted to a burlesque in the style of the Washington Street Players. Mrs. Fiske enhanced whatever merit the play had: "There are many bright lines and amusing bits of comedy, but they gained their best effect by her vivid and salient comedy method. Burns Mantle recognized that the play itself would appeal only to "a limited and intellectual public".

Aside from Mrs. Fiske, who wore pants and smoked cigars while in character, José Ruben was the only actor consistently singled out for praise by the Broadway critics. The reviewer for Brooklyn Life said Ruben's acting "is not eclipsed even by that of so great an actress as Mrs. Fiske, and he far surpasses any member of her supporting company".

Closing
Madame Sand closed at the Knickerbocker Theatre on January 12, 1918.

Touring company
Following Broadway, the play went on tour for two months, starting in Chicago on January 21, 1918. It finished up in Boston on March 9, 1918.

Cast

Adaptions
A revival opened in London at the Duke of York's Theatre on June 3, 1920. It starred Mrs. Patrick Campbell as George Sand, with Basil Rathbone as Alfred de Musset, and Frank Cellier as Heine.

Notes

References

1917 plays
George Sand